The Kaoss Pad is an audio sampling instrument and multi-effects processor originally launched by Korg in 1999. It allows users to record and process audio samples and apply various effects using an X-Y touchscreen.

Features 
Kaoss Pads allow users to sample and loop audio and apply effects such as pitch-bending, flange, distortion, and delay using an X/Y touchscreen.

According to the Guardian, while its effects technology was not new, the Kaoss Pad was distinguished by its intuitive design: "Anyone can pick one up and in a matter of seconds get the hang of it." The British producer and musician Brian Eno described it as "a way of taking sounds into the domain of muscular control" as opposed to working with computers: "It takes you into a completely different place, because when working with computers you normally don't use your muscles in that way. You're focused on your head, and the three million years of evolution that resulted in incredible muscular skill doesn't get a look in."

Users 
Radiohead use a Kaoss Pad on performances of their 2000 song "Everything In Its Right Place", manipulating singer Thom Yorke's vocals into a "glitching, stuttering collage". Other users include Brian Eno, the Muse guitarist Matt Bellamy (who has Kaoss Pads built into his guitars), John Linnell of They Might Be Giants, Bryan Ferry,  Beardyman, Kevin Martin, and New York based electronic musician Ian Cook, who often uses the device for live resampling in a jazz/improvisation context, notably with Travis Sullivan’s Bjorkestra, violinist Lucia Micarelli, and Jason Miles’ Global Noise.

See also
Kaossilator, a Korg synthesizer with a Kaoss Pad interface

References

External links
Korg.com

Samplers (musical instrument)
Grooveboxes